Prince Jackson may refer to:

Prince A. Jackson Jr., former president of Savannah State College 
"Prince" Michael Joseph Jackson, Jr., Michael Jackson's eldest child